is a railway station in Yokohama, Japan, jointly operated by Central Japan Railway Company (JR Central), East Japan Railway Company (JR East), Yokohama City Transportation Bureau, Sagami Railway (Sotetsu), and Tokyu Railways (Tokyu).

Lines
Shin-Yokohama Station is served by the Tōkaidō Shinkansen, Yokohama Line, Yokohama Municipal Subway Blue Line, Sōtetsu Shin-Yokohama Line, and Tōkyū Shin-Yokohama Line.

Station layout
The JR station consists of an island platform at ground level serving the Yokohama Line, with two elevated island platforms for the shinkansen tracks overhead. The shinkansen platforms 2 and 3 have safety fences, as some trains passed non-stop through the station prior to 2008. The JR Central portion of the station includes a Midori no Madoguchi staffed ticket office. Also, The JR East portion of the station includes a Reserved Seat Ticket Vending Machines.

The Municipal Subway, Tōkyū Railways and Sagami Railway (Sōtetsu) share an underground integral concourse which forms a cross shape. The Municipal Subway owns the northwest to southeast corridor which provides three separate sets of ticket gates, with the northwest (so-called the "Nissan Stadium ticket gate") and central paid areas providing elevators for barrier-free access to the subway Blue Line platform level which is 1-story below the underground concourse. The northeast concourse is managed by Tōkyū while the southwest is Sōtetsu. The platforms of Sōtetsu–Tōkyū Shin-Yokohama Lines are 3-story below the integral concourse. Only the southwest concourse manged by Sōtetsu has elevators for the Sōtetsu–Tōkyū platform level. Exits 1 and 5A at the southern side of the concourse are closer to the JR concourse.

JR platforms

Yokohama Municipal Subway platforms

Sōtetsu–Tōkyū through service platforms

Platforms 2 and 3 share the same track which is primarily for southbound trains which terminate at this station or emergency docking.

History

Real estate agents purchased the private property in the area by telling residents and local government officials that the land was needed to build a Nissan/Ford motor vehicle factory which would provide increased employment.  Actually, however, the agents were in league with JNR and national politicians from the LDP party to acquire the land for the proposed station, which was not disclosed to the public at this time.  The subterfuge was subsequently exposed in a novel and popular film called Kuro No Cho Tokkyu.  The police opened several investigations, but the suspected agents, JNR employees, and political staffers fled the country until the statute of limitations on the alleged crimes expired.

Shin-Yokohama Station opened on 1 October 1964, with the opening of the Tokaido Shinkansen. At the time, the surrounding area was completely rural, and the site was selected as it was the intersection of the Tōkaidō Shinkansen tracks with the existing Yokohama Line. The station was connected to the Yokohama Municipal Subway system on 14 March 1985. With the privatization of JNR on 1 April 1987, the JNR portion of the station came under the operational control of JR East. The station building was remodeled in 1998.

Station numbering was introduced to the Yokohama Line platforms 20 August 2016 with Shin-Yokohama being assigned station number JH16.

Sōtetsu–Tōkyū Shin-Yokohama Line

The Sōtetsu Shin-Yokohama Line and Tōkyū Shin-Yokohama Line jointly operated station opened on 18 March 2023, with 2 platforms and 3 tracks, where the middle track will be used for Tōkyū train which originates service from here. This platform layout will also enable Sōtetsu and Tōkyū to turn back when accidents occur. The station is jointly operated by Sōtetsu and Tōkyū.

On 16 September 2022, the station numbers were finalized. The station, which acts as the boundary between the Sotetsu and Tokyu portions of the line, will be assigned two station numbers to reflect the two operators: SO-52 for the Sotetsu line and SH-01 for the Tokyu line.

Because the new platforms are directly 2-level underneath the municipal subway Blue Line platform, the existing platform was underpinned to fortify the foundation. The operation of the subway Blue Line was not obstructed during the construction of the new station. Because of the achievement of commencing such a difficult task, all the involved construction parties were awarded by the Japan Society of Civil Engineers in 2020.

Passenger statistics
In fiscal 2012, the JR East station was used by an average of 57,439 passengers daily (boarding passengers only). The JR East passenger figures for previous years are as shown below.

Surrounding area
The Nissan Stadium (formerly International Stadium Yokohama), the largest stadium in Japan with a capacity of 72,327 seats,  was host to the 2002 FIFA World Cup final match and is the home of the Yokohama F Marinos soccer team. The Nissan Stadium, Yokohama Arena, and Yokohama Rosai Hospital are each about a 10 minute walk from the station. The Shin-Yokohama Raumen Museum is about a 5 minute walk from the station.

Nearby hotels
 Shin Yokohama Prince Hotel
 Hotel Associa Shin-Yokohama

References

External links

 Shin-Yokohama station information (JR Central) 
 Shin-Yokohama station information (JR East) 
 Shin-Yokohama station information (Yokohama Subway) 
 Shin-Yokohama station information (Tokyu Railways) 
 Shin-Yokohama station information (Sotetsu Group) 

Railway stations in Japan opened in 1964
Railway stations in Yokohama